Coleophora helvolella is a moth of the family Coleophoridae.

References

helvolella
Moths described in 1994